One United States Navy ship has borne the name Pulaski, after Casimir Pulaski.  Another ship has borne the name Casimir Pulaski.  This ship is sometime incorrectly referred to as USS Pulaski.  There was yet another USN ship which   contained the word Pulaski.

Named for Casimir Pulaski
 
 

Named for place which was named to honor Casimir Pulaski

See also
 , a Polish Navy frigate
 Pulaski (disambiguation)

United States Navy ship names